Vlastimil Zábranský (2 September 1936 – 4 February 2021) was a Czech visual artist.

Biography
Zábranský began studying at the Secondary school of Civil Engineering in Prague in 1953. He then studied at Masaryk University in Brno and the Higher Pedagogical School, where he majored in arts and Czech. He graduated in 1961 after studying under Professor . He briefly worked as a teacher before devoting himself fully to art in 1963. He opened his own studio on Stojanová Street in Brno, which served as a meeting place for influential people in the city. He often donated funds from auctions to charities, particularly ecological foundations. In 1970, he became a member of the Société Protectrice de l'Humour in France.

Zábranský's works had a subtle, dreamy technical design and he often created figural motifs. He also often included social and political criticisms such as cartoons, as seen in his naked portrayal of former President of the Czech Republic Václav Klaus.

Vlastimil Zábranský died of pneumonia in Brno on 4 February 2021 at the age of 84.

References

External links
 Lambiek Comiclopedia article.

1936 births
2021 deaths
Czech artists
Czech male painters
Masaryk University alumni
People from Brno
People from Beroun District
Deaths from pneumonia in the Czech Republic